UR, Ur  or ur may refer to:

Arts and entertainment

Gaming
 A location in Final Fantasy III
 A race of aliens in Fading Suns, a role-playing game
 Royal Game of Ur, an ancient board game

Music
 "UR", pronounced "you are", a song from the album Supposed Former Infatuation Junkie by Alanis Morissette
 "U R", a song by Monsta X on their 2019 EP Follow: Find You
 "UR/A Tear in the Open", a song from the album Just Be by DJ Tiësto
 UR (band), a satellite band of Secret Chiefs 3 from the U.S. city of San Francisco, California
 Underground Resistance (band), a U.S. techno music label
 Universal Records (Philippines), a Philippine record label

Other media
 Ur, a novella by Stephen King
 UR (Unrated), used for a film not submitted for rating, or an uncut version of a film
 Sveriges Utbildningsradio, the Swedish Educational Broadcasting Corporation

Language
 Úr (...), a letter of the Ogham alphabet
 Ur (cuneiform), a cuneiform sign
 ur (digraph), a digraph in Central Alaskan Yup'ik for /ʁʷ/, and in Pinyin for the trilled vowel /ʙ̝/
 Ur (root), a common root word in the Basque language
 Ur (rune) (ᚢ), a letter of the runic alphabets
 Ur-, a German prefix meaning "primeval" (seldom also "primitive") or even simply "original"
 Underlying representation, in phonology
 Urdu language (ISO 639 alpha-2 code "ur")
 "you're" (you are) or "your" in text messaging

Places
 Ancient populated places:
 Ur, an ancient city-state in southern Mesopotamia
 Ur of the Chaldees, or Ur Kaśdim, scriptural birthplace of Abraham
 Modern populated places:
 Ur, Iran, a village in Ardabil Province, Iran
 Ur, Pyrénées-Orientales, a commune of the Pyrénées-Orientales Département, France
 Canton of Uri, Switzerland
 Hayy Ur, a neighborhood of Baghdad, Iraq

Religion and esotericism
 Ur, the king of the underworld in Mandaeism
 UR Group, Italian esotericist association

Science, technology, and mathematics
 Ur, a continent that formed 3,100 million years ago
 Ur, a programming language
 UR Mark, a certification mark of Underwriters Laboratories
 Ur, a Polish anti-tank rifle
 Unitary representation, in group theory
 Ur, an obsolete symbol for the element Uranium
 Universal Rocket, a Soviet rocket family

Vehicles
 Universal Rocket, a family of Russian rockets developed by Khrunichev
 UrQuattro, prefix of the original Audi Quattro automobile, 1980–1991
 Ursaab, prefix of the original Saab automobile, 1949

Universities

United States
 University of Richmond, in Virginia
 University of Rochester, in New York
 University of Redlands, in California

Other countries
 Universität Regensburg, Germany
 University of Regina, Canada
 Universidad Regiomontana, Monterrey, Mexico
 University of La Réunion, France
 University of La Rioja, Spain
 University of Rwanda
 UR, the IATA code of Uganda Airlines

See also
 Ur-fascism
 Urtext (disambiguation)